Harold Fethe is a professional jazz guitarist in San Francisco, California who began his recording career later than most. For more than two decades he worked in biotechnology. In 2002 he give that up and became a full-time musician. He recorded Out of Nowhere, his first album as a bandleader, in 2004 with 87-year-old violinist Johnny Frigo. The album contains mostly standards in a style suggestive of gypsy jazz.

The album received favorable reviews from Jazz Review and AllMusic.

Discography
 Out of Nowhere (Southport, 2006)

References

American jazz guitarists
Swing guitarists
Gypsy jazz guitarists
Living people
Guitarists from San Francisco
21st-century American guitarists
American male guitarists
Jazz musicians from San Francisco
21st-century American male musicians
American male jazz musicians
Year of birth missing (living people)